The Nail (Spanish:El Clavo) is a 1944 Spanish romance drama film directed by Rafael Gil. It is based on the novel of the same title by Pedro Antonio de Alarcón.

Plot
Castile, 19th Century. Judge Joaquín Zarco (Rafael Durán) travel in a stagecoach with a beautiful woman, Blanca (Amparo Rivelles). It is Carnavile. They fall in love but she disappears...

Crew
Future filmmaker José Antonio Nieves Conde was the director's assistant.

Reception
The movie was a great success upon its release. In 1944, it won second place in the Best Film category of the 'National Syndicate of Spectacle'.

External links
 

1944 films
Spanish historical romance films
1944 romantic drama films
1940s historical romance films
1940s Spanish-language films
Spanish black-and-white films
Spain in fiction
Films based on Spanish novels
Films based on works by Pedro Antonio de Alarcón
Films directed by Rafael Gil
Films set in the 19th century
Cifesa films
Spanish romantic drama films
1940s Spanish films